Alewali is a village in Nakodar tehsil, Jalandhar district, of Indian state of Punjab.

About 
Alewali lies on the Nakodar-Shahkot road which lies at a distance of 3 km from it.
The nearest railway station to Alewali is Gadran railway station at a distance of 1 km.

Post code 
Alewali's Post office is Bara Sidhpur whose post code is 144040.

References 

  A Punjabi site with Alewali's details

Villages in Jalandhar district
Villages in Nakodar tehsil